Uckington is a hamlet in the English county of Shropshire located about a mile north-east of Wroxeter village and to the east of Shrewsbury.

External links 

Villages in Shropshire